State Road 414 (SR 414) is a state highway in the U.S. state of Florida encompassing the John Land Apopka Expressway and Maitland Boulevard.

Route description

Free section
The free section is built mostly to expressway standards, with few driveway access points, at-grade intersections at minor roads, and interchanges at major roads. The road was once numbered State Road 426A. From east to west, the road begins and travels through Maitland, Florida, intersecting U.S. Route 17 with an interchange. It then intersects County Road 427. the road then widens to 6 lanes briefly at the Interstate 4 Interchange, and enters the business center of Maitland Summit. The road then briefly travels through Seminole County, Florida and the city of Altamonte Springs, with an interchange with State Road 434 before ending at U.S. Highway 441 in Lockhart, Florida in Orange County, Florida. The road previously ended here prior to the opening of the toll road section further west.

Toll road
An extension to the west has been built around the south side of Apopka and back to U.S. Highway 441 (SR 500) via State Road 429. During planning and construction, it was called the Apopka Bypass or the Maitland Boulevard Extension.  It was named after Apopka mayor John Land in December 2005. The tollway is owned and operated by the Central Florida Expressway Authority (CFX).

Phase 1 of the toll road section runs from U.S. Highway 441 at an interchange, widens to 6 lanes west and continues west. Passing by exits with Hiawassese Road and limited access Keene Road, A Sunpass/Epass supported toll area, and an interchange with State Road 451 and State Road 429 (Western Beltway) south of Apopka. Ground broke on the project on January 19, 2007 at the southeast corner of SR 414 and US 441.  Construction ran way ahead of schedule and the roadway from Exit 4 to Exit 8 was opened on February 14, 2009 for vehicles with SunPass and E-Pass transponders. Exit 6 was not included in the early opening. The entire road opened for all vehicles on May 15, 2009. On signage, the eastbound control city is Maitland and the westbound control city is Apopka.

Some of the additions and modifications in Phase 1 include:
 Nearly the entire toll road is elevated.
 The intersection of SR 414 and US 441 was shifted slightly southward and turned into a grade-separated half-folded diamond interchange.  SR 414 passes over US 441.  The 7-11 at the southeast corner of the interchange was demolished to accomplish this.
 The Florida Central Railroad bridge over US 441 just to the north of the intersection with State Road 414 was demolished during June 2007. Railroad tracks that had continued east to Forest City, Florida were removed. This location is the site of westbound exit and entrance ramps with US 441.
 Apopka Blvd. (CR 424) was broken where SR 414 passes through. The north side was diverted to end at US 441 at SR 414's new westbound off ramps, with a cul-de-sac sticking out briefly to the south. The south side simply ends in a cul-de-sac.
 SR 414 is six lanes, three in each direction over the entire currently constructed distance.
 A SPUI interchange was constructed at Hiawassee Road, with SR 414 passing to the south of the recently opened Wekiva High School (Orange County Public Schools). 
 A westbound off-ramp to, and an eastbound on-ramp from Keene Road has been built.
 Coral Hills Road, a side-street to the west of Clarcona Road (CR 435), was closed where SR 414 passes through and ends in cul-de-sacs on both sides.  This is the location of the only mainline toll plaza in Phase 1 of SR 414.
 The mainline toll is $1.25 cash, less for those with a transponder.
 Continuing west, State Road 414 originally ended at the interchange at SR 429. When the toll road first opened, there was a direct ramp to northbound State Road 429 but traffic desiring to go southbound on State Road 429 had to exit onto County Road 437A (Ocoee-Apopka Road) and travel one-quarter-mile to the State Road 429 southbound on-ramp. Southbound traffic on State Road 429 desiring to travel eastbound on State Road 414 had a direct ramp however northbound traffic on State Road 429 desiring to travel eastbound on State Road 414 also had to exit onto CR 437A. On May 14, 2012, new SR 429 Exit 31 opened which fully connected the two toll roads and eliminated the need to leave the expressway system. On January 19, 2013, Phase 2 of SR 414 then opened.

Phase 2
Construction on Phase 2 began with earth movement during June, 2010 at the former western terminus of SR 414 and opened on January 19, 2013. The new section is signed concurrently as both SR 414 and SR 429 and continues west and then north to an intersection a quarter-mile north of Plymouth-Sorrento Road at U.S. Route 441 where the SR 414 designation ends. A surface road has been built at that location connecting to US 441 and Plymouth-Sorrento Road. SR 414 terminates here although the road continues signed only as SR 429.

There are no exit or entrance ramps on the Phase 2 section. There are no toll facilities on the Phase 2 section however it is impossible to travel on Phase 2 without paying a toll elsewhere. Half-mile Markers correspond with SR 429 only. What was previously SR 429 north of the current SR 414 junction has been resigned as State Road 451. However, there are no direct connections from SR 451 southbound to SR 429 northbound nor from SR 429 southbound to SR 451 northbound. The road is entirely concurrent until the SR 414 designation ends at an access road for US 441. SR 429 extends further north, and will eventually reach Interstate 4 and SR 417.

Plans for further extension, eventually to meet Interstate 4 in Sanford, are part of a corridor known as the Wekiva Parkway, part of SR 429.

Future
As part of an I-4 Ultimate project SR 414 was entirely reconstructed between the I-4 interchange and Maitland Summit Boulevard. The project is effectively completed except for some final work on the pedestrian overpass.

CFX is also looking at extending the tolled section of SR 414 eastward from US 441 (Orange Blossom Trail) to SR 434, meeting the existing freeway section of SR 414. The toll lanes are proposed to be elevated above the median, while existing at-grade lanes will be maintained for local access.

Major intersections

See also
Central Florida Expressway Authority

References

External links

 SR 414 (Apopka Expressway) – Central Florida Expressway Authority

414
414
414
414
414
Central Florida Expressway Authority